Brendan Daly (born 2 February 1940) is a former Irish Fianna Fáil politician. He was a long-serving Teachta Dála (TD) for the Clare constituency, a government minister, and Senator.

Daly was born in February 1940 in Cooraclare, County Clare, and educated locally at CBS Kilrush school. His political career began at the 1973 general election, when he was elected to Dáil Éireann as a Fianna Fáil TD for Clare. He held his seat at six further general elections before losing it at the 1992 general election. He was returned at the 1997 general election but was defeated again in the 2002 general election.

Daly was a strong supporter of Charles Haughey during his period as Fianna Fáil leader. In 1980 Daly became Minister of State at the Department of Labour. In 1982 he joined the Cabinet as Minister for Fisheries and Forestry. When Fianna Fáil returned to power after the 1987 general election he once again became a minister, this time as Minister for the Marine in the 20th Government of Ireland.

Daly was not re-appointed as a minister when Fianna Fáil entered into coalition with the Progressive Democrats after the 1989 general election, but was appointed as Minister of State at the Department of the Taoiseach with responsibility for Heritage Affairs and Minister of State at the Department of Finance with responsibility for the Office of Public Works. He returned to the cabinet in February 1991 as Minister for Defence. In November Albert Reynolds and Pádraig Flynn were sacked from the government and Daly was appointed Minister for Social Welfare. His time in cabinet was short-lived; in February 1992, Haughey resigned as Taoiseach and was succeeded by Reynolds, who did not appoint Daly to cabinet. He was appointed as Minister of State at the Department of Foreign Affairs from February 1992.

Daly lost his Dáil seat in the election that year, retaining his position as Minister of State until the formation of a new government in January 1993. He in the Seanad election on the Agricultural Panel, and was returned to the 20th Seanad.

He was re-elected to the Dáil at the 1997 general election but lost his seat at the 2002 general election. He stood for election to the 22nd Seanad on the Labour Panel, and was returned to the Seanad for a second time.

He was unsuccessful again at 2007 general election, and did not contest the subsequent elections to the 23rd Seanad. He has since retired from public life.

Brendan Daly married Patricia Carmody of Kilrush, County Clare in the early 1970s. She died in March 2014. They have three children.

References

 

1940 births
Fianna Fáil TDs
Living people
Members of the 20th Dáil
Members of the 21st Dáil
Members of the 22nd Dáil
Members of the 23rd Dáil
Members of the 24th Dáil
Members of the 25th Dáil
Members of the 26th Dáil
Members of the 19th Seanad
Members of the 20th Seanad
Members of the 28th Dáil
Members of the 22nd Seanad
Politicians from County Clare
Ministers for Defence (Ireland)
Ministers for Social Affairs (Ireland)
Ministers of State of the 26th Dáil
Ministers of State of the 21st Dáil
Nominated members of Seanad Éireann
Fianna Fáil senators